This is a full list of Special Agent Oso episodes made by series creator Ford Riley. There are 60 episodes in the whole series, 24 in the first season and 36 in the second season. Season 2 is no longer airing on Playhouse Disney UK due to the channel shutting down. Alongside Season 1, the episode titles are parodies of the names of James Bond movies and novels.

Series overview

Episodes
The episodes are listed in order of production.

Season 1 (2009–2010)

Note: The italic text indicates that the characters are absent from both a and b.

Note: Oso, Paw Pilot, and Mr. Dos were present in all episodes.

Season 2 (2010–2012)

Note: The italic text indicates that the characters are absent from both a and b.

Note: Oso, Paw Pilot, and Mr. Dos were present in all episodes.

Three Healthy Steps
Special Agent Oso: Three Healthy Steps was a short series that airs in the United States and the United Kingdom during the Disney Junior programming block. It encourages children to use "three healthy steps" regarding eating and exercising. 

Characters that are featured in the short series are Special Agent Oso, Paw Pilot, Special Agent Wolfie, Special Agent Dotty, and Professor Buffo. The children featured in each episode are filmed in live-action. Starting from February 14 to 27, 2011, all 15 episodes have aired:

References

Lists of American children's animated television series episodes
Lists of Canadian children's animated television series episodes
Lists of British animated television series episodes